Professor Works Laboratory Vol. 2 is a retail Mixtape by American rapper Chucky Workclothes. It was released by his label Team Insomniac on August 26, 2016.

Background
Professor Works Laboratory Vol. 2 is the second installment of the Professor Works Laboratory series. The mixtape includes guest features from Young Bleed, Mr. Envi', Syke Pachino, Tha Homie Jai, Omega, Enocc, Keylo G and S.O.M Boss Hog. The EP was supported by the singles "Believe It" and "What We Do".

Track listing

References

External links 
 Professor Works Laboratory, Vol. 2 on iTunes. 
 Professor Works Laboratory, Vol. 2 on Amazon.

Chucky Workclothes albums
2016 EPs
Self-released EPs